Bailhongal Assembly constituency is one of the 225 constituencies in the Karnataka Legislative Assembly of Karnataka a south state of India. Bailhongal is also part of Belagavi Lok Sabha constituency.

Members of Legislative Assembly

Mysore State
 1967: B. B. Annappa, INC 
 1972: P. B. Aravali Patil, Indian National Congress (Organisation)

Karnataka State
 1978: Balekundargi Ramlingappa Chanabasappa, INC 
 1983: Balekundargi Ramlingappa Chanabasappa, INC 
 1985: Koujalagi Shivananda Hemappa, Janata Party
 1989: Koujalagi Shivananda Hemappa, Janata Dal
 1994: Koujalagi Shivananda Hemappa, Janata Dal
 1996 (by polls): Koujalagi Mahantesh Shivanand, Janata Dal
 1999: Koujalagi Mahantesh Shivanand, Janata Dal (United)
 2004: Jagadish Virupakshi C Matgud, Bharatiya Janata Party
 2008: Jagadish Virupakshi C Matgud, Bharatiya Janata Party
 2013: Vishwanath Patil, Karnataka Janata Paksha

See also
 Bailhongal
 Belagavi district
 List of constituencies of Karnataka Legislative Assembly

References

Assembly constituencies of Karnataka
Belagavi district